1980 - The Choice Is Yours is the second album by the British punk rock band The Members, released in 1980.

Track listing
 "The Ayatollah Harmony" (Nigel Bennett)
 "Goodbye to the Job" (Nick Tesco, Jean-Marie Carroll)
 "Physical Love" (Nicky Tesco, Chris Payne)
 "Romance" (Jean-Marie Carroll)
 "Brian Was" (Jean-Marie Carroll)
 "Flying Again" (Chris Payne)
 "Normal People" (Nick Tesco, Jean-Marie Carroll)
 "Police Car" (Larry Wallis)
 "Clean Men" (Nick Tesco, Jean-Marie Carroll)
 "Muzak Machine" (Chris Payne)
 "Gang War" (Nick Tesco, Jean-Marie Carroll)

(2005 CD Bonus Track)
 "GLC" (Adrian Lillywhite, Gary Baker, Nicky Tesco, Steve Morley)
 "Killing Time" (Jean-Marie Carroll, Nicky Tesco)
 "Ballad of John & Martin" (Chris Payne, Jean-Marie Carroll, Nicky Tesco)
 "Disco Oui Oui" (The Members)
 "Love in a Lift" - soul version (Chris Payne, Nicky Tesco)
 "Rat up a Drainpipe" - new version (Chris Payne)

Personnel
The Members
Nicky Tesco - lead vocals
Nigel Bennett - lead guitar, vocals
Jean-Marie Carroll - guitar, vocals
Chris Payne - bass, vocals
Adrian Lillywhite - drums, percussion
with:
Joe Jackson - piano
Rupert Hine - keyboards
Albie Donnelly - saxophone
Rico Rodriguez - trombone
Dick Cuthell - flugelhorn
Technical
John Brand - engineer
Keith Breeden, Malcolm Garrett - sleeve

References

1980 albums
The Members albums
Albums produced by Rupert Hine
Virgin Records albums